Laurynas Grigelis and Andrea Pellegrino were the defending champions but chose not to defend their title.

Marcelo Arévalo and Tomislav Brkić won the title after defeating Ariel Behar and Gonzalo Escobar 6–4, 6–4 in the final.

Seeds

Draw

References

External links
 Main draw

Internazionali di Tennis Emilia Romagna - Doubles
Emilia-Romagna Open